The Liberty Building is located at 420 Main Street, across the Buffalo Metro Rail from Lafayette Square in Buffalo, New York, USA.

History
Built in 1925, the 23 story office tower is an example of neoclassical architecture. At the time of its completion, the Liberty Building was the largest office building in downtown Buffalo and was built for Liberty National Bank to serve as their headquarters. Liberty National Bank was originally called the German American Bank but its name was changed to Liberty National Bank after World War I to remove any connection to that war's main enemy. In order to illustrate the bank's new image, the building was christened with three replicas of the Statue of Liberty sculpted by Leo Lentelli in 1925. Two statues on the roof, one facing west, and the other facing east, represent Buffalo's strategic location on the Great Lakes. A third statue was placed over the Main Street entrance. Only the rooftop statues remain today. They stand 36 feet tall and are illuminated at night.

An addition to the building, designed by Lyman & Associates was completed in 1961.

Present Day

On September 23, 2010, French tightrope walker Didier Pasquette completed a successful 150 ft walk across a high-wire suspended between the two statues atop the building. He completed the walk in two minutes and 59 seconds.

The building is owned by the Main Place Liberty Group, who also own the Main Place Tower.

The Liberty Building is the fifth tallest building in Buffalo.

Gallery

See also
List of tallest buildings in Buffalo

References

External links

 
 

Office buildings completed in 1925
Skyscraper office buildings in Buffalo, New York
Tourist attractions in Buffalo, New York
Neoclassical architecture in New York (state)